Robert Poulin is an evolutionary ecologist specialising in the ecology of parasitism. He is a professor of zoology at the University of Otago and a Fellow of the Royal Society of New Zealand.

Biography
Poulin grew up in Canada, taking his bachelor's degree in aquatic biology at McGill University, Montreal and gaining his doctorate at Université Laval, Quebec City. He became a researcher in Quebec. He moved to New Zealand in 1992, where he is a professor of zoology, leading a research group studying the ecology of parasites at the University of Otago.

He has written numerous papers and book chapters: his Evolutionary Ecology of Parasites has been cited at least 2400 times; his co-written Parasites in food webs: the ultimate missing links has been cited over 900 times; his The diversity of parasites has been cited over 700 times; his Parasite Biodiversity and Parasitism and group size in social animals: a meta-analysis have each been cited over 600 times; 14 other works have been cited over 300 times each. In all he has been cited over 44,000 times, with an h-index over 105 and an i10-index over 550.

Poulin is married with two sons.

Awards and distinctions

Poulin became a Fellow of the Royal Society of New Zealand in 2001, and won the New Zealand Association of Scientists' Research Medal the same year.
In 2002 he was awarded a James Cook Research Fellowship by the Royal Society Te Apārangi.
In 2007 he won the Robert Arnold Wardle Award of the Canadian Society of Zoologists.
In 2011 he won the Hutton Medal of the Royal Society of New Zealand.
He was awarded the University of Otago's Distinguished Research Medal in 2013.

The North African tortoise pinworm Tachygonetria poulini is named for him, as is the New Zealand parasitic fluke Maritrema poulini, and the parasitic cryptogonimid trematode Siphoderina poulini.

Books

Authored

 Poulin, R., & Morand, S. (2004). Parasite biodiversity. Smithsonian Books.
 Poulin, R. (2004). Going in circles: the complex transmission routes of parasites. University of Otago.
 Poulin, R. (2011) [1998]. Evolutionary ecology of parasites (2nd ed.). Princeton University Press. (1st ed. Chapman and Hall)

Edited
 Poulin, R., Morand, S., & Skorping, A. (Eds.). (2000). Evolutionary Biology of Host-Parasite Relationships: Theory meets Reality. Elsevier.
 Poulin, R. (Ed.). (2002). Parasitology – Parasites in Marine Systems (Supplement, No. 124, Parasitology). Cambridge University Press.
 Morand, S., Krasnov, B. R., & Poulin, R. (Eds.). (2006). Micromammals and macroparasites: From evolutionary ecology to management. Springer, 647p.

References

Canadian zoologists
Canadian ecologists
Evolutionary ecologists
Academic staff of the University of Otago
Canadian parasitologists
Université Laval alumni